B